Weightlifting was contested from 5 to 8 March at the 1951 Asian Games in National Stadium, New Delhi, India. The competition included only men's events for seven different weight categories. Iranians dominated in all events and claimed 10 medals in total including seven golds.

Medalists

Medal table

References
 Results

External links
 Weightlifting Database

 
1951 Asian Games events
1951
Asian Games
1951 Asian Games